Yard is a 21-story, -tall apartment building built at the Burnside Bridgehead in Portland, Oregon's Kerns neighborhood, in the United States. It was designed by Skylab Architecture for Key Development Co. of Hood River and Guardian Real Estate Services of Portland.

Description
Yard includes 21 above ground floors. The -tall concrete and glass high rise was designed by Skylab Architecture. It is a mixed-use development with ground floor retail and 284 apartments. The sixth through eighth floors are set aside for working-class studio apartments, available through a lottery process.

Given its appearance, the building is referred to as the "Death Star" and was dubbed "the new apartment building you'll love to hate".

History
The Portland Development Commission started buying land at the east end of the Burnside Bridge about 2000 for a redevelopment project, eventually spending $11 million. Plans were first submitted to develop the property in 2006, but eventually the project was delayed due to the Great Recession. Construction began in October 2014 on what was estimated to be a $58 million project. The building topped out in January 2016 with a ceremony attended by Congressman Earl Blumenauer.

The Yard is the winner of a 2018 honor award from the American Society of Landscape Architects.

References

External links

 

2016 establishments in Oregon
Apartment buildings in Portland, Oregon
Kerns, Portland, Oregon
Residential buildings completed in 2016
Residential skyscrapers in Portland, Oregon
Northeast Portland, Oregon